Thoma Darmo (b. 21 September 1904 in Iyel, Ottoman Empire – d. in Baghdad, Iraq on 7 September 1969) was the Catholicos-Patriarch of the Ancient Church of the East, from 1968 to 1969. Prior to that, he served as Metropolitan of India, from 1952 to 1964, within the Church of the East.

Church of the East

Thoma Darmo was born as Mansour Darmo, son of Elisha and Shirine. He spent his childhood in Turkey and from 1919 in Iraq, becoming an ordained clergyman in 1921. He continued to serve in Iraq for 15 years. Then he moved to Syria where he served from 1936 to 1952.

In June 1952, he was assigned as Metropolitan of India, based at Trichur (Kerala), and thus became one of senior hierarchs of the Church of the East. He built a number of churches and established a number of new dioceses in India, encouraged the preparation of new clergy and established the Mar Narsai Press. In January 1964, he was suspended from the metropolitan office by Patriarch Shimun XXI Eshai.

Ancient Church of the East

Subsequently, after three years of the seat of the Ancient Church of the East remaining vacant (1964–1967), Mar Thoma Darmo was elected as Catholicos-Patriarch in October 1968.

He relocated the Ancient Church of the East to Baghdad where the church is headquartered. He died the following year on 7 September 1969. He was succeeded in 1970 by Catholicos-Patriarch Mar Addai II.

Aftermath
In 1995, under new Patriarch Dinkha IV of the rival Assyrian Church of the East, reconciliation between fractions in India was achieved, and on that occasion the validity of ordinations performed by Thoma Darmo after the suspension of 1964 was recognized, and in 1997 the suspension itself was annulled by the Holy Synod of the Assyrian Church of the East.

References

Sources

External links 
 

Patriarchs of the East
Ancient Church of the East
20th-century bishops of the Assyrian Church of the East
1904 births
1969 deaths
Church of the East in India
Assyrians from the Ottoman Empire
20th-century people from the Ottoman Empire
20th-century Iraqi people
20th-century archbishops